Beni Tangama Baningime (born 9 September 1998) is a Congolese professional footballer who plays as a central midfielder for Scottish Premiership club Heart of Midlothian.

Early life
Baningime grew up in the Lemba district of Kinshasa. He left at the age of 8, after his father, who was working as doctor in England, moved the family to Wigan.

Career

Everton 
Baningime joined Everton at the age of nine. He is an academy graduate of the club and won honours such as 'The Premier League 2' and the Dallas Cup during his time in the Everton F.C. Reserves and Academy. Baningime also won the Everton F.C. Reserves and Academy Player of the Year award for the 2016/17 season. Baningime's senior debut came in a  League Cup game against Chelsea in October 2017. Baningime made his Premier League debut as a half-time substitute against Leicester City on 29 October 2017.

In January 2019, he was loaned to Wigan Athletic until the end of the season.

On 1 February 2021, Baningime joined Championship side Derby County on loan for the remainder of the 2020−21 season, reuniting with former Everton teammate Wayne Rooney who is manager. Two days later, he made his debut for the Rams as a substitute for Graeme Shinnie in a 0–3 away league defeat by Rotherham United.

Hearts 
On 29 July 2021, Baningime joined Scottish Professional Football League club Heart of Midlothian for a nominal fee and signed a three-year deal. Baningime played his debut for Hearts in a 2–1 home win against Celtic, playing the full match and receiving the Man of the Match award.

Personal life
Baningime's younger brother Divin Baningime is also a footballer, who most recently played for Wigan Athletic.

Baningime is a Christian. He prays before every match, and reads the Bible.

Career statistics

References

External links
Profile at the Everton F.C. website

Living people
1998 births
Footballers from Kinshasa
Democratic Republic of the Congo footballers
Association football midfielders
Everton F.C. players
Wigan Athletic F.C. players
Derby County F.C. players
Premier League players
Heart of Midlothian F.C. players
English footballers
21st-century Democratic Republic of the Congo people
Footballers from Wigan